The Vukani is a local weekly newspaper distributed to the township areas of Cape Town, Western Cape, South Africa. It is written in Xhosa and English. Vukani means "Wake up" in both the isiZulu and isiXhosa languages. The newspaper covers items of interest to large communities in Khayelitsha, Langa, Nyanga and Gugulethu.

See also
 List of newspapers in South Africa

External links
 The Inc (Vukani)

Weekly newspapers published in South Africa
Mass media in Cape Town
Publications with year of establishment missing